Verona Lake is a small lake in geographic Lee Township in the Unorganized West Part of Timiskaming District, in northeastern Ontario, Canada. The lake is in the James Bay drainage basin and is on Tomwool Creek. The nearest community is Bourkes,  to the northeast.

The primary inflows, at the north, is Tomwool Creek arriving from Cariad Lake. The primary outflow, at the southeast, is also Tomwool Creek, which heads east to Burl Lakes. Tomwwool Creek flows via Sarsfield Creek, Meyers Lake, Woollings Creek, the Whiteclay River, the Black River, the Abitibi River and the Moose River to James Bay.

References

Other map sources:

Lakes of Timiskaming District